Matej Gorelka (3 April 1989) is a Slovak footballer who plays as a striker for FK Beluša.

External links
 at official club website 

1989 births
Living people
Slovak footballers
FK Dubnica players
FK Iskra Borčice players
Slovak Super Liga players
Association football forwards
People from Ilava
Sportspeople from the Trenčín Region